The 1988 CECAFA Cup was the 15th edition of the tournament. It was held in Malawi, and was won by the hosts. The matches were played between November 6–19.

Group A
Played in Lilongwe

Group B
Played in Blantyre

Semi-finals

Abandoned in 107' (a.e.t.) at 0–0 due to power failure.

Third place match

Final

References
Rsssf archives

CECAFA Cup
CECAFA